Kolosso may refer to:

Kolosso (comics)
Kolosso, Mali